Carrie & Barry is a British television sitcom first broadcast on BBC One between 2004 and 2005, it stars Neil Morrissey, Claire Rushbrook, Mark Williams and Michelle Gomez.

Produced by Hartswood Films, it reunited Morrissey with writer Simon Nye, executive producer Beryl Vertue and director Martin Dennis. It was produced by Sue Vertue.

Neil Morrissey plays part-time taxi driver Barry and Claire Rushbrook is his beautician wife Carrie.  The couple find themselves with the daily challenges of keeping the spice in their marriage and the fun in their day jobs – as well as having to deal with Barry's teenage daughter Sinéad (Sarah Quintrell) from his disastrous first marriage. In an interview for Best magazine in 2012 Neil Morrissey stated that this role remains the one role of which he is the most proud.

Mark Williams plays Barry's mate Kirk, who co-owns his black cab (he does the night shifts) whilst Michelle Gomez is Carrie's acid-tongued best friend and fellow beautician Michelle.

External links
 
 
 
 Carrie & Barry at British TV Comedy

2000s British sitcoms
2004 British television series debuts
2005 British television series endings
BBC television sitcoms
Fictional beauticians
Television series by Hartswood Films